Jules Adler (Luxeuil-les-Bains, 8 July 1865 – Nogent-sur-Marne, 11 June 1952) was a French painter, named «le peintre des humbles» by Louis Vauxcelles, a painter of labour, strikes and working people.

References

External links
 Jules Adler on website - réunion des musées de France

19th-century French painters
French male painters
20th-century French painters
20th-century French male artists
1865 births
1952 deaths
19th-century French male artists